Vitovt Kazimirovich Putna (1893–1937) was a Soviet Red Army officer of Lithuanian origin.

A World War I veteran of the Imperial Russian Army and Bolshevik since 1917, Putna was a komdiv during the Polish–Soviet War and commanded a variety of divisions. During the retreat following the Battle of Warsaw, he gathered around him ad-hoc corps out of defeated units and enabled the remnants of the Red Army to escape from a large cauldron near Białystok. In 1921, he took part in suppressing the Kronstadt Rebellion and Peasant uprisings on the Lower Volga. In 1923, he was sent as a military advisor to China and between 1927 and 1931, he was military attaché to Japan, Finland and Germany. He was posted to the Far East Military district in 1931 and was made military attache to Great Britain in 1934.

He was promoted to comcor in 1935. Putna was arrested during the Great Purge on 20 August 1936, tried for alleged espionage and anti-Soviet activities together with Mikhail Tukhachevsky in the so-called Case of Trotskyist Anti-Soviet Military Organization, sentenced to death on 11 June 1937 and executed the next day.

The Soviet government posthumously exonerated him after Joseph Stalin's death, when he was formally rehabilitated in 1957.

References 

1893 births
1937 deaths
People from Molėtai District Municipality
People from Troksky Uyezd
Old Bolsheviks
Left Opposition
Soviet komkors
Lithuanian people of World War I
Russian military personnel of World War I
People of the Polish–Soviet War
Soviet military personnel of the Russian Civil War
Recipients of the Order of the Red Banner
Case of the Trotskyist Anti-Soviet Military Organization
Great Purge victims from Lithuania
Members of the Communist Party of the Soviet Union executed by the Soviet Union
Lithuanian people executed by the Soviet Union
Soviet rehabilitations
Soviet military attachés